Sterling City is the county seat of Sterling County, Texas, United States. Its population was 1,121 at the 2020 census.

History
Sterling City was named for W.S. Sterling, a buffalo hunter and Indian fighter. Land for the new town was donated in January 1891 by R.C. Stewart, and was platted by H.B. Tarver in February. That same year, it was designated the seat of Sterling County. The town soon grew to 300 residents and had its own newspaper, a hotel, a post office, several other businesses, a school, and three churches.

Sterling City was a stop on the Santa Fe Railroad by 1910, but the service was eventually abandoned. The depot still exists as a tourist site.

During World War Two, Sterling City's population decreased by 10%. When it was incorporated in August, 1955, Sterling City had a population of some 800 and had added three more churches, a hospital, a bank, and a library.

On May 25, 1955, 15 United States Air Force personnel, flying in a B-36 bomber under the callsign Abbot 27, perished in a crash near Sterling City. The airmen were members of the 40th Bomb Squadron of the 6th Bombardment Wing at Walker Air Force Base in Roswell, New Mexico. A monument in their honor was erected in 2007 at the Tom Green County Courthouse in San Angelo.

Geography

Sterling City is located on the Edwards Plateau in west-central Texas along the North Concho River at  (31.839066, –100.985871). It is accessed by U.S. Highway 87 and State Highways 158 and 163, and covers area of 0.98 sq mi (2.5 km), all of it land.

Windmills have been a feature of Sterling City since the early 20th century, when the town claimed to have more windmills per acre than any other place in the world, totaling some 300. Today, most of Sterling City's windmills are giant turbines in modern wind farms on a ridge about 20 miles northwest of the town and visible from U.S. Highway 87.

Demographics

2020 census

As of the 2020 United States census, there were 1,121 people, 344 households, and 291 families residing in the city.

2000 census
As of the census of 2000,  1,081 people, 393 households, and 297 families resided in the city. The population density was 1,105.9 people/sq mi (425.9/km). The 467 housing units averaged 477.7/sq mi (184.0/km). The racial makeup of the city was 82.05% White, 0.09% African American, 0.37% Native American, 0.09% Pacific Islander, 14.80% from other races, and 2.59% from two or more races. Hispanics or Latinos of any race were 33.30% of the population.

Of the 393 households, 36.9% had children under 18 living with them, 62.8% were married couples living together, 8.1% had a female householder with no husband present, and 24.4% were not families. About 23.4% of all households were made up of individuals, and 12.7% had someone living alone who was 65 or older. The average household size was 2.69, and the average family size was 3.18.

In the city, the age distribution was 29.6% under 18, 5.5% from 18 to 24, 29.2% from 25 to 44, 20.0% from 45 to 64, and 15.7% who were 65  or older. The median age was 38 years. For every 100 females, there were 94.4 males. For every 100 females age 18 and over, there were 90.7 males.

The median income for a household in the city was $36,359, and for a family was $38,958. Males had a median income of $32,500 versus $18,654 for females. The per capita income for the city was $14,955. About 14.3% of families and 17.7% of the population were below the poverty line, including 22.3% of those under age 18 and 19.3% of those age 65 or over.

Education
The city of Sterling City is served by the Sterling City Independent School District and home to the Sterling City High School Eagles.

Gallery

References

External links

Cities in Sterling County, Texas
Cities in Texas
County seats in Texas
Populated places established in 1891
1891 establishments in Texas